Lawn bowls at the Southeast Asian Games is a lawn bowls competition (normally held every two years) between national bowls organisations in Southeast Asia. It is one of the sports that form the Southeast Asian Games.

Past winners

Men

Women

See also
 World Bowls Events

References

Bowls competitions
Sports at the Southeast Asian Games